"The Itch" a song by American pop singer Vitamin C, released as the first single from her second album, More (2001). Released on October 10, 2000, it peaked at number 45 on the US Billboard Hot 100 and number six in Australia, where it was certified platinum.

Reception
The song failed to crack the top 40 on the US Billboard Hot 100 in 2001, peaking at number 45. It had moderate success by peaking on the Billboard Top 40 Mainstream chart at number 26. In Australia, "The Itch" reached number six on the ARIA Singles Chart and was certified platinum by the Australian Recording Industry Association (ARIA) for shipping 70,000 copies. It also peaked at number 34 in New Zealand on the RIANZ Singles Chart.

Music video
Kirsten Dunst and Mila Kunis both appear in the video with Vitamin C. The video includes film clips from the movie Get Over It, which stars all three women, although the song was not part of the film itself. The music video for the single was directed by Brothers Strause.

Track listings
US and Canadian CD single
 "The Itch" (original version)
 "Graduation (Friends Forever)" (original version)

UK, European, and Australian CD single
 "The Itch" (radio edit)
 "The Itch" (original version)
 "Graduation (Friends Forever)" (original version)
 "The Itch" (DJ Scribbles Club Mix)

European maxi-CD single
 "The Itch" (radio edit) – 3:14
 "The Itch" (album version) – 3:29
 "The Itch" (DJ Skribbles radio edit) – 3:13

Credits and personnel
Credits are taken from the Canadian CD single liner notes.

Studios
 Recorded at 3:20 Studios, Standard Electrical Recorders, and the Hit Factory (New York City)
 Mixed at the Hit Factory (New York City)

Personnel

 Vitamin C – writing (as Colleen Fitzpatrick), vocals, background vocals
 Billy Steinberg – writing
 Jimmy Harry – writing, keyboards, production, arranging, programming
 Alex Edenborough – background vocals
 Donna Deloray – background vocals
 Jennifer Karr – additional vocal production
 Brad Gilderman – mixing
 Flip Osman – mixing assistant
 Nena Brandan – mixing assistant

Charts

Weekly charts

Year-end charts

Certifications

References

2000 singles
2000 songs
Elektra Records singles
Songs written by Billy Steinberg
Songs written by Jimmy Harry
Songs written by Vitamin C (singer)
Vitamin C (singer) songs